In Greek mythology, an Amazonomachy (English translation: "Amazon battle"; plural, Amazonomachiai or Amazonomachies) is a mythological battle between the ancient Greeks and the Amazons, a nation of all-female warriors. The subject of Amazonomachies was popular in ancient Greek art and Roman art.

Symbolism of Amazonomachy 

Amazonomachy represents the Greek ideal of civilization. The Amazons were portrayed as a savage and barbaric race, while the Greeks were portrayed as a civilized race of human progress. 
According to Bruno Snell's view of Amazonomachy:

For the Greeks, the Titanomachy and the battle against the giants remained symbols of the victory which their own world had won over a strange universe; along with the battles against the Amazons and Centaurs they continue to signalize the Greek conquest of everything barbarous, of all monstrosity and grossness.

Amazonomachy is also seen as the rise of feminism in Greek culture. In Quintus Smyrnaeus's The Fall of Troy, Penthesilea, an Amazonian queen, who joined on the side of the Trojans during the Trojan war, was quoted at Troy, saying:

Not in strength are we inferior to men; the same our eyes, our limbs the same; one common light we see, one air we breathe; nor different is the food we eat. What then denied to us hath heaven on man bestowed?

According to Josine Blok, Amazonomachy provides two different contexts in defining a Greek hero. Either the Amazons are one of the disasters from which the hero rids the country after his victory over a monster; or they are an expression of the underlying Attis motif, in which the hero shuns human sexuality in marriage and procreation.

In the 5th century, the Achaemenid Empire of Persia began a series of invasions against Ancient Greece. Because of this, some scholars believe that on most 5th-century Greek art, the Persians were shown allegorically, through the figure of centaurs and Amazons.

In art
Warfare was a very popular subject in Ancient Greek art, represented in grand sculptural scenes on temples but also countless Greek vases. On the whole fictional and mythical battles were preferred as subjects to the many historical ones available. Along with scenes from Homer and the Gigantomachy, a battle between the race of Giants and the Olympian gods, the Amazonomachy was a popular choice.

Later, in Roman art, there are many depictions on the sides of later Roman sarcophagi, when it became the fashion to depict elaborate reliefs of battle scenes. Scenes were also shown on mosaics. A trickle of medieval depictions increased at the Renaissance, and especially in the Baroque period.

West metopes of Parthenon
Kalamis, a Greek sculptor, is attributed to designing the west metopes of the Parthenon, a temple on the Athenian Acropolis dedicated to the Greek goddess Athena. The west metopes of the Parthenon depict a battle between Greeks and Amazons. Despite its mutilated state, scholars generally concur that the scene represents the Amazon invasion of Attica.

Shield of Athena Parthenos
The shield of Athena Parthenos, sculpted by Phidias, depicts a fallen Amazon. Athena Parthenos was a massive chryselephantine sculpture of Athena, the main cult image inside the Parthenon at Athens, which is now lost, though known from descriptions and small ancient copies.

Bassae Frieze in Temple of Apollo

The Bassae Frieze in the Temple of Apollo at Bassae contains a number of slabs portraying Trojan Amazonomachy and Heraclean Amazonomachy. The Trojan Amazonomachy spans three blocks, displaying the eventual death of Penthesilea at the hands of Achilles. The Heraclean Amazonomachy spans eight blocks and represents the struggle of Heracles to seize the belt of the Amazon queen Hippolyta.

Amazonomachy frieze from Mausoleum at Halicarnassus

Several sections of an Amazonomachy frieze from the Mausoleum at Halicarnassus are now in the British Museum. One part depicts Heracles grasping an Amazon by the hair, while holding a club behind his head in a striking manner. This Amazon is believed to be the Amazon queen Hippolyta. Behind Heracles is a scene of a Greek warrior clashing shields with an Amazon warrior. Another slab displays a mounted Amazon charging at a Greek, who is defending himself with a raised shield. This Greek is believed to be Theseus, who joined Heracles during his labours.

Other
Micon painted the Amazonomachy on the Stoa Poikile of the Ancient Agora of Athens, which is now lost.
Phidias depicted Amazonomachy on the footstool of the chryselephantine statue of Zeus at Olympia.

In 2018, archaeologists discovered relief-decorated shoulder boards made from bronze that were part of a breastplate of a Greek warrior at a Celtic sacrificial place near the village of Slatina nad Bebravou in Slovakia. Deputy of director of Slovak Archaeological Institute said that it is the oldest original Greek art relic in the area of Slovakia. Researchers analyzed the pieces and determined they were once part of a relief that depicted the Amazonomachy.

Gallery

See also
 For discussion of such battles, see Amazons in historiography
 For the most famous Amazonomachy, see Attic War
 For representation of Amazonomachies as depicted in ancient visual art, see Amazons in art and Warfare in Ancient Greek Art
 Amazon statue types
 Centauromachy
 Gigantomachy

References

Further reading
Weitzmann, Kurt, ed., Age of spirituality: late antique and early Christian art, third to seventh century, no. 200, 1979, Metropolitan Museum of Art, New York, ; full text available online from The Metropolitan Museum of Art Libraries

External links

 Fragment of a marble shield
 Slabs from the Amazonomachy frieze from the Mausoleum at Halikarnassos
 Amazonmachy: The Art of Progress

Hellenistic art
War in mythology
Ancient Greek military art

War art
Iconography
Women in war in Greece